Chile competed at the 2020 Winter Youth Olympics in Lausanne, Switzerland from 9 to 22 January 2020. They competed with 8 athletes in 4 sports.

Alpine skiing

Boys

Girls

Cross-country skiing 

Boys

Girls

Freestyle skiing 

Ski cross

Slopestyle & Big Air

Snowboarding

Halfpipe, Slopestyle, & Big Air

See also

Chile at the 2020 Summer Olympics

References

2020 in Chilean sport
Nations at the 2020 Winter Youth Olympics
Chile at the Youth Olympics